Histone demethylase may refer to:

 Demethylase
 (Histone-H3)-lysine-36 demethylase